Secret Wars II is a role-playing game adventure published by TSR in 1986 for the Marvel Super Heroes role-playing game.

Plot summary
Secret Wars II is a supplement covering the plot and locations of the "Secret Wars II" comic series, with up-to-date statistics for all heroes and villains involved, including the Beyonder.

In Secret Wars II, the Beyonder, who used to be a universe until he discovered our universe and realized that he wasn't the only thing in creation, and so therefore he wants to know what it is like to have other experiences. Secret Wars II contains a 32-page character book containing the full potential cast of heroes and villains and new characters who had not been featured in the game before, including the New Mutants, Defenders, and Power Pack, and other characters such as Mephisto, Eternity, Death, and the Watcher. Also included is a 32-page campaign book detailing the plot, and a map that covers another section of New York with a couple of general purpose terrains on the back of it.

Publication history
MHSP2 Secret Wars II was written by Jeff Grubb, with a cover by John Byrne, and was published by TSR, Inc., in 1986 as two 32-page books, a large color map, and an outer folder.

Reception
Pete Tamlyn reviewed Secret Wars II for White Dwarf #79.
He comments on the plot, stating that as "there is an awful lot to it, nothing is covered in very much detail", and that "any average GM can probably write ten times better than Jim Shooter, so you may well be able to carry it off", and goes on to say: "The essence of the plot is that the heroes are faces with an enemy who can wipe out the world with a flick of his pinky, has the education of a 2-year old and wants to grow up. The heroes have to play mummy and daddy." Despite this, Tamly considers this adventure to be "an awful lot better than Secret Wars I. To start with, although there are potentially even more heroes involved, you don't have to play them all at once. Only at the end do the numbers get ridiculous. And there is quite a bit of plot to it, much of it the interesting psychological stuff. You can't out-fight The Beyonder, so you have to out-talk him. Your players should be utterly shell-shocked by the time they finish this." He complains, "as the SWII plot ran for almost a year and crossed over into almost every Marvel title, the chances of your having done this are not high. TSR have cut corners to keep the package down to a reasonable size, but not having character pictures for some of the new bad guys is a bit poor." Tamlyn concludes: "Because of its structure and basis in a particular comic story you have to be running an MSH campaign to use this. It is a must for MSG addicts because of the new characters and the map, though even they might find it too heavy to use. Anyone else, forget it."

References

Marvel Comics role-playing game adventures
Role-playing game supplements introduced in 1986